Steve Müller (born 16 May 1985) is a German former professional footballer who played as a defender.

External links
 
 

1985 births
Living people
German footballers
Association football defenders
1. FC Magdeburg players
VfB Lübeck players
VfL Wolfsburg II players
FC Erzgebirge Aue players
Wuppertaler SV players
Holstein Kiel players
Hertha BSC II players
TSG Neustrelitz players
3. Liga players
Regionalliga players